Zawada  is a village in the administrative district of Gmina Kamienica Polska, within Częstochowa County, Silesian Voivodeship, in southern Poland.

The village has a population of 649.

References

Zawada